Cruise of the Jasper B is a 1926 American silent action/adventure comedy film produced by Cecil B. DeMille and directed by James W. Horne. The film is loosely based on the 1916 novel of the same name by American poet Don Marquis, although the film adaptation and novel share little in common.

Plot
The film stars actor Rod La Rocque as 'Jerry Cleggert', a good-natured descendant of an 18th-century pirate who resides aboard the rickety ship Jasper B. Cleggert is informed that in order to inherit a large inheritance, he must marry on his twenty-fifth birthday - otherwise he would relinquish all claims to his impending fortune.

Jerry soon meets his ideal would-be bride Agatha Fairhaven (Mildred Harris) and the two immediately fall in love. Complications arise when the dastardly Reginald Maltravers (Snitz Edwards) attempts to cheat Agatha out of her inheritance.

The courting couple suffer a series of mishaps on the way to altar; they are waylaid en route by a trio of bandits, escape from a runaway taxi cab, and outrun a mob of unscrupulous state authorities.

The weary couple finally manage to wed just before the deadline on board the Jasper B and Cleggert inherits his family fortune.

Cast
Rod La Rocque - Jerry Cleggett 
Mildred Harris - Agatha Fairhaven 
Snitz Edwards - Reginald Maltravers 
Jack Ackroyd - Wiggins 
Otto Lederer - Auctioneer 
James T. Mack - Assistant Auctioneer  
Billy Engle - Little Mover  
Charlie Hall - Mover 
Fred Kelsey - Bailiff  
Tiny Sandford - Big Mover

See also
Paradise for Two, a 1927 film about inheritance
Five and Ten Cent Annie (1928); a similar themed lost movie

References

External links

BFI listing

1926 films
American silent feature films
1926 adventure films
American black-and-white films
Films based on American novels
American action adventure films
Producers Distributing Corporation films
Adaptations of works by Don Marquis
Films directed by James W. Horne
1920s American films
Silent adventure films